Juha Ovaskainen (born 30 October 1961) is a Finnish diver. He competed at the 1984 Summer Olympics and the 1988 Summer Olympics.

References

External links
 

1961 births
Living people
Finnish male divers
Olympic divers of Finland
Divers at the 1984 Summer Olympics
Divers at the 1988 Summer Olympics
Divers from Helsinki
20th-century Finnish people